The Valvetronic system is a BMW variable valve lift system which, in combination with VANOS, allows infinite adjustment of the intake valve timing and duration. The system claims to improve fuel economy and emissions, and negates the need for a throttle body in regular use.

First introduced by BMW on the 316ti compact in 2001, Valvetronic has since been added to many of BMW's engines. The first application of this technology in a turbocharged engine was the N55 engine.

See also
 VANOS: BMW's variable valve timing
 Prince engine

References

Variable valve timing
BMW